Wolfgang Schmelzer (born 13 June 1940) is a German former cyclist. He competed in the team pursuit at the 1968 Summer Olympics.

References

External links
 

1940 births
Living people
East German male cyclists
Olympic cyclists of East Germany
Cyclists at the 1968 Summer Olympics
Cyclists from Berlin
People from East Berlin